It'll be Alright on the Night is a British television bloopers programme broadcast on ITV and produced by ITV Studios. It was one of the first series created with the specific purpose of showing behind the scenes bloopers from film and TV.

The programme was originally presented by Denis Norden from 1977 until 2006. Griff Rhys Jones took over as presenter from 2008 until 2016. Since 2018, the series has been narrated by David Walliams. Norden died on 19 September 2018, aged 96.

Format
The programme is usually one hour in length and aired in ITV's Saturday evening entertainment slot. However, some of the first few episodes up to and including It'll be Alright on the Night 6 which aired in 1990, originally went out on a Sunday evening. Two episodes also debuted on a Friday: It'll be Alright on the Night 3 and It'll be Alright on Christmas Night on Christmas Day 1981 and 1987 respectively. The programme's success led to the competing BBC One series Auntie's Bloomers presented by Terry Wogan, which focused on bloopers from some of the BBC archives.

The programme followed a simple format. Norden, traditionally holding his trademark clipboard in his hand, appeared on an otherwise empty stage and delivered a humorous piece to camera, followed by a selection of outtakes taken from various sources. Popular sources for clips include numerous British and American sitcoms, news reports and foreign broadcasts which may or may not include explanatory subtitles.

The programme returned in September 2008 with Griff Rhys Jones who presented 11 episodes of It'll be Alright on the Night. The last episode featuring Rhys Jones was broadcast on 4 June 2016. After a two-year break, the programme returned in summer 2018 with brand new episodes featuring David Walliams as narrator, which is opposed to a presenter in the studio, which meant that for the first time since the programme began, studio presentation was no longer included.

New editions of the programme, narrated again by Walliams, began airing from September 2020. These editions introduced a new feature entitled the 'Big Cock-Up Question' where before each advert break, a small portion of a clip would be played before it stops and Walliams asks viewers to guess what happens next; the answer being revealed following the break.

Episodes
The audience figures (where given) are those for the initial transmission of an episode. It was not unheard of, especially in the early years of the series, for episodes to achieve higher ratings on repeat showings. For instance, It'll be Alright on the Night 2 (first shown on 28 October 1979) was watched by 16 million viewers for a repeat showing in February 1983, while It'll be Alright on the Night 4 (first shown on 11 March 1984) was watched by 18.5 million viewers on its initial repeat in January 1985. A further repeat of The Second Worst of Alright on the Night (first shown on 24 November 1985) achieved the programme's highest ratings of 19.92 million in February 1992.

Broadcasting
Although a staple of ITV's light entertainment programming for over 40 years, few editions of It'll be Alright on the Night have been produced, with rarely more than one new episode a year being screened. Episodes presented by Denis Norden have normally included a number in their title screens to aid identification with the audience, while from 2008 to 2016, episodes presented by Griff Rhys Jones and from 2018 onwards, episodes narrated by David Walliams no longer did so. Towards the end of the Denis Norden era, episodes up to and including It'll be Alright on the Night 20 were prefixed with "All New" to avoid viewer confusion with repeat screenings of earlier episodes.

During its run, several special episodes were also made, including anniversary specials, a late night edition for Channel 4 with more mature adult content and a one-off political special to mark the 2001 general election.

The majority of the episodes were filmed at The London Studios, but in the programme's later years, the Granada studios in Manchester were also used, as well as the now-closed (and demolished) Meridian studios at Northam, Southampton. A few editions were also filmed on-location; these included Alright on the Night's Cockup Trip which was presented from the Great Cockup fell in the Lake District, 21 Years of Alright on the Night was presented on a yacht supposedly in the middle of the Bermuda Triangle (which, in reality, was in the south of France) and It'll be Alright on the Night 11, which was presented from an empty Haymarket Theatre, London.

During its run, the series has had three main producers: Paul Smith (1977–1984), Paul Lewis (1984–2002) and Simon Withington (2003–2006). Sean Miller, James Sunderland and Stephanie Dennis also produced some episodes. Grant Philpott was the series producer (2011, 2012 and 2018) and Simon Withington, who previously served as a producer from 2003 to 2006 has been the executive producer from 2014 to 2016. In 2020, Chris Thornton became the series producer.

Denis Norden's Laughter File
The series also inspired the spin-off programme Denis Norden's Laughter File, which  began airing on 22 September 1991 and ran until 13 May 2006. Although it largely followed the same format as its sister programme, while It'll be Alright on the Night focused solely on bloopers/outtakes, Laughter File also screened clips that included pranks and practical jokes. As with It'll be Alright on the Night, later episodes included the words "All New" in their titles to avoid viewer confusion with repeat screenings of earlier episodes.

The theme music used for Denis Norden's Laughter File throughout the whole of its run was a library piece, called "Dress to Kill" by Errol Reid. The programme's producers were Paul Lewis (1991–2002) and Simon Withington (2002–2006).

Episodes

Notes

References

External links
BBC Cult TV
.
.

1970s British comedy television series
1980s British comedy television series
1990s British comedy television series
2000s British comedy television series
2010s British comedy television series
2020s British comedy television series
1977 British television series debuts
Blooper shows
ITV comedy
London Weekend Television shows
Television series by ITV Studios
English-language television shows